Tasveer is a Seattle based South Asian social justice arts non-profit organization. Tasveer organizes events like film festivals, community speaks events and others to celebrate the voices of South Asian people through art and film. The organisation also has Tasveer TV, an online streaming platform that curates South Asian independent films The recurring annual events by Tasveer include Tasveer South Asian Film Festival and Tasveer South Asian Literary Festival. During pandemic, In 2020, multiple South Asian festivals were thinking about cancelling the events in US and Canada. However, Tasveer brought them together to host a bigger online global South Asian Film Festival under the name Coalition of South Asian Film Festivals'(CoSAFF). In 2021, Tasveer merged their film festival and literary festival into one, known as Tasveer Festival.

History 
Tasveer was founded in 2002 in Seattle shortly after 9/11 event. It was founded by Rita Meher and Farah Nousheen who were tired of the hate and prejudice because of their south asian identity. Tasveer includes voices of South Asian countries like Afghanistan, Bangladesh, Bhutan, India, Maldives, Nepal, Pakistan, Sri Lanka and their diasporas worldwide. The Tasveer South Asian Film Festival was launched in 2004.

CoSAFF 2020 
There was no individual 15th edition of the festival in 2020. In this year Tasveer merge with  other festivals like Vancouver fests; Mosaic International Festival in Toronto; Nepal America fest in Maryland; and the South Asian Film Festival of Montreal to create an online South Asian Film Festival called CoSAFF. Tasveer Film Fund that awarded grants to south asian film makers in US was started in the yar 2020.

Tasveer South Asian Film Festival 14th Edition (2019) 
In 2019, Tasveer curated more than 60 films in all genres with a focus on LGBTQ issues and women's rights  Some of the films included  The Illegal, The Price of Free, A Monsoon Date, fest centerpiece, and The Sweet Requiem. The festival awarded Shabana Azmi with Tasveer Emerald Award and had Director Danish Renzu (In Search of America) and star Suraj Shama (Life of Pi) for a question-answer discussion with the audience.

Tasveer South Asian Film Festival 13th Edition (2018) 
The 13th edition of Tasveer's Film festival had Pakistan as the country of focus and invited Sharmeen Obaid-Chinoy as a guestSome of the films included A Girl In The River, Look But With Love, Sarmad Masud’s My Pure Land and Ali Osman Bajwa’s Gorakh Dhandha. The festival had the theme #knowMe and had Laila Kazmi as the program director.

References 

South Asian diaspora
Indian film festivals
Non-profit organizations based in Seattle